The Art Institute of New York City was a for-profit college in New York City.  The school was one of a number of Art Institutes, a franchise of for-profit art colleges with many branches in North America, owned and operated by Education Management Corporation.  Founded in 1980 as The New York Restaurant School, and renamed in 2001, it was accredited by the Accrediting Council for Independent Colleges and Schools.

The Art Institute of New York City officially closed in 2017.

References

External links 
 

New York City
Educational institutions established in 1980
Private universities and colleges in New York City
Universities and colleges in Manhattan
1980 establishments in New York City
Educational institutions disestablished in 2017